Thomas Wyatt (c.1799 – 1859) was an English portrait-painter, born at Thickbroom circa 1799. He studied in the school of the Royal Academy, and accompanied his brother Henry to Birmingham, Liverpool, and Manchester, practising as a portrait-painter without much success. In Manchester he tried photography. Eventually he settled as a portrait-painter in Lichfield, and died there on 7 July 1859. His works are best known in the Midland counties, and especially at Birmingham, where he held the post of secretary to the Midland Society of Artists.

Personal
Wyatt was the younger brother of the artist Henry Wyatt.

Works

Thomas Wyatt (A. M.), A Manual of Conchology, Publisher Harper & Brothers, 1838
 Beauties of Sacred Literature: Illustrated by Eight Steel Engravings, edited by Thomas Wyatt, A.M., Publisher James Munroe & Company, 1848

References
Albert Nicholson, Dictionary of National Biography, 1885-1900, Volume 63
Gent. Mag. 1840, ii. 555
Samuel Redgrave, A Dictionary of Artists of the English School, Publisher G. Bell, 1878
Manchester City News, 15 May 1880
Bryan's Dict. ed. Graves
Graves's Dict. of Artists

Notes

External links

19th-century English painters
English male painters
British genre painters
English portrait painters
1799 births
1859 deaths
19th-century English male artists